The 1977–78 Bradford City A.F.C. season was the 65th in the club's history.

The club finished 22nd in Division Three, being relegated to Division Four, reached the 1st round of the FA Cup, and the 1st round of the League Cup.

The club was relegated to Division Four after just one season in Division Three.

Sources

References

Bradford City A.F.C. seasons
Bradford City